Cantello is a comune (municipality) in the Province of Varese in the Italian region Lombardy, located about  northwest of Milan and about  east of Varese, on the border with Switzerland.

The municipality of Cantello contains the frazioni (subdivisions, mainly villages and hamlets) Gaggiolo and Ligurno.

Cantello borders the following municipalities: Arcisate, Cagno, Clivio, Malnate, Rodero, Stabio (Switzerland), Varese, Viggiù.

Demographic evolution

References

External links
 www.comune.cantello.va.it

Cities and towns in Lombardy